Palisades is an unincorporated community in Douglas County, Washington, United States. Palisades has a post office with ZIP code 98845.

A post office called Palisades was established in 1908. The community was named for a nearby rock formation.

References

Unincorporated communities in Douglas County, Washington
Unincorporated communities in Washington (state)